John D. Groendyke is an American trucking executive. He is the Chief Executive Officer of Groendyke Transport, the 5th largest (2015) bulk tank truck company serving the US and Canada, headquartered in Enid, Oklahoma.

Early life
Groendyke graduated from Wentworth Military Academy in 1964, where he achieved the highest rank of cadet, Brigade Commander. Following graduation, he attended Oklahoma State University earning a bachelor's degree in business in 1966. Groendyke further continued his education by obtaining a Juris Doctor degree from the University of Oklahoma in 1969.

After a 2-year stint in the US Army, where he served as a captain, he returned to Enid, Oklahoma.

Career
After returning to Enid, Groendyke went to work at Groendyke Transport, the family trucking operation, founded in 1932, by his father, H.C. Groendyke.

In 1974, Oklahoma Governor David L. Boren appointed Groendyke to serve on the Oklahoma Wildlife Conservation Commission, an 8-member board controlling the Oklahoma Department of Wildlife Conservation, with a term of 8 years. Six different governors continued to appoint him to the commission, resulting in Governor Mary Falin issuing a Citation in December 2016, recognizing Groendyke's 40 years of service with the group, and declaring Dec. 13, 2016 'Commissioner John Groendyke Day'.

Since 2003, Groendyke has been a Director of Energy on the board of OGE Energy Corp. and its operating company, Oklahoma Gas & Electric.

In 2004, he was named to the board of directors of the Oklahoma State Fair.

Oklahoma State University Alumni Association inducted Groendyke into the OSU Hall of Fame on Feb. 13, 2015. The award recognizes "alumni and former students with outstanding lifetime achievements in society and professional life." Prior to Groendyke's 2015 class induction, only 165 members of the 207,000 alumni had been honored with the award.

References

 Forbes profile

Living people
American trucking industry businesspeople
Businesspeople from Oklahoma
Military personnel from Oklahoma
United States Army soldiers
University of Oklahoma alumni
Wentworth Military Academy and College alumni
Year of birth missing (living people)